Tara Chambler (also known as Tara Chamblers in The Walking Dead: Rise of the Governor) is a fictional character from the horror drama television series The Walking Dead, which is based on the comic book series of the same name. The character made her debut in the 2011 novel The Walking Dead: Rise of the Governor, based on The Walking Dead comic books, under the name Tara Chamblers. In the television series, Tara was portrayed by Alanna Masterson. She was the first character who identified as LGBT to be introduced in the series.

In the television adaptation, Tara's family encounters the Governor, under the alias "Brian Heriot", and they invite him into their apartment complex. Later, Tara's sister, Lilly, forms a relationship with him, although Tara remains fiercely protective of her sister and her niece. Eventually, after her father dies, the Governor and Tara's family leave the apartment complex and find Caesar Martinez's camp. As the Governor coerces the people of the camp to attack the safe haven prison, Tara discovers his true brutality and the vendetta he maintains, and is traumatized when he murders Hershel Greene. After the downfall of the prison, Glenn Rhee comes to Tara for help in finding his wife, Maggie, who escaped during the gunfire. Tara reluctantly follows him on his quest and, eventually, becomes a member of Rick Grimes' group after he forgives her for being part of the Governor's militia. She remains an active part of the group when they reach the Alexandria Safe-Zone where she sparks up romance with Dr. Denise Cloyd, and becomes one of Alexandria's primary supply runners. After the death of Denise, Tara moved to Hilltop and eventually became their leader after Jesus (Paul) dies. The Whisperers murder Tara and several others, and placed their heads spikes as a warning to the communities.

The character has received a generally neutral reception from television critics. Tara initially received praise for her character's early story arc in season 4, but was later criticized for her lack of characterization and involvement in the series. In addition to the mixed reviews, Tara's only character-focused episode "Swear" was not well-received by critics.

Appearances

The Walking Dead: Rise of the Governor
Tara Chalmers lives in Atlanta with her sister April and her father David in an apartment building that they have secured. April saves a group of people, including the man later known as the Governor, from a large herd of undead. The elderly, cancer-stricken David later dies and turns into a walker without having been bitten. After the Governor kills David, tension grows between him and Tara. The Governor then sexually assaults April. The next morning, April is nowhere to be found, and Tara forces the group, at gunpoint, to leave the building.

Television series

Tara Chambler is Lilly's sister, David's daughter, and Meghan's aunt.

Season 4

Tara Chambler is introduced in the episode "Live Bait". After welcoming the Governor (who called himself "Brian Heriot") into their apartment, Tara seems to trust him relatively sooner than her sister and quickly seems to see him as a friend. When her father David dies and reanimates as a walker, he attacks Tara, but the Governor saves her by killing David. She is devastated and angry at first, but later accepts and agrees with the decision, realizing that all people who die turn, whether they have been bitten or not. She and the others leave the apartment after burying David, in search of shelter elsewhere. While on the road, a group of walkers forces them to flee. They are stopped once again when the Governor and Meghan fall into a pit full of walkers, all of which the Governor kills before they can do any harm. In the episode "Dead Weight", Tara begins a romantic relationship with Alisha, at Ceasar Martinez's camp. In the mid-season finale "Too Far Gone", Tara joins the Governor in attacking the prison, using Hershel and Michonne as leverage, and believing the prison occupants to be bad people, as Brian tells them. However, when Rick Grimes tries to reason with the Governor for the sake of his people. Tara begins to question Brian's plan, especially when Brian holds a sword to Hershel's neck, despite Rick offering to welcome them in. Rick, seeing that Tara doesn't want to be there, tries to personally reason with Tara but she is too conflicted to answer. When the Governor decapitates Hershel, Tara tries to retreat from the battle. Alisha tries to get her to fight back, but Tara walks away, traumatized.

In the mid-season premiere "Inmates", in the aftermath of the prison attack, Glenn Rhee finds Tara hiding within the gates and tells her that he needs her help to escape the prison and find his wife, Maggie Greene, Hershel's daughter. Tara is angry with herself for trusting the Governor and reveals that she saw Lilly die and questions why Glenn wants her help; he states that he doesn't want it, but needs it. After fighting off walkers, Glenn collapses with fatigue and Tara is left to attack the walker who tried to bite him. She is encountered by Abraham Ford, Eugene Porter and Rosita Espinosa, who are impressed by her skills and ask her to accompany them. In the episode "Claimed", she travels alongside the trio until Glenn forces them to stop the truck as Abraham explains that their mission is to get Eugene to Washington D.C. to cure the outbreak. However, Glenn still insists on finding Maggie; Tara and the others accompany him after Eugene accidentally rips the truck's fuel line, and she begins to bond with Abraham. In the episode "Us", Tara and Glenn enter a tunnel on the road to Terminus, where Glenn believes Maggie might be, and they find evidence of a fresh cave-in, as well as many trapped walkers. Glenn insists he needs to see the faces of the walkers to ensure none of them are Maggie, and Tara helps. When the two set a diversion with a flashlight to sneak around the swarm of walkers, Tara slips and gets her ankle stuck in the debris. She tells Glenn to leave her, but Glenn, tired of losing people, fires on the walkers until he runs out of bullets and tries to commit suicide. They are then unexpectedly saved by Abraham, Eugene and Rosita, who have found Maggie. Glenn introduces Tara to Maggie but says that he met Tara on the road, avoiding any mention of the Governor. Tara later agrees to join Abraham in his mission to Washington D.C., and they reach Terminus. In the season finale "A", they are forced into a train car with the rest of the group. Rick recognizes Tara from the prison, but says nothing.

Season 5

In the episode "No Sanctuary", Tara crafts a makeshift weapon to use in the escape attempt, but it fails and she is left inside. She encourages the group and is confident that they will be able to survive their break-out. When Rick opens the boxcar for everyone to escape, Tara helps kill walkers on their way out and aids in protecting the group. In the episode "Strangers", Tara speaks to Rick about her involvement with the Governor; he tells her that he was aware of her hesitation to be there and that is why he tried to talk to her. After they resolve their differences he accepts her as part of his family. Later, the group follows Gabriel Stokes to his church. She goes on a supply run with Glenn and Maggie, and forms a close bond with Maggie. Later, Tara reveals the truth to Maggie that she was with the Governor during Hershel's murder at his hands. After Tara explains herself, Maggie forgives her and they hug. In the episode "Four Walls and a Roof", upon hearing of Gareth's return, Abraham demands that the group leave for Washington right away. As part of a bargain to make him stay and fight, Tara promises to go with him tomorrow regardless of what happens. She joins Rick's posse to help trap Gareth's group inside the church, and then watches as Rick, Michonne, Sasha and Abraham brutally slaughter the Terminus cannibals. The next day she is with the others bidding farewell to Bob before he dies from infection, and then following Abraham in the church bus to Washington. In the episode "Self Help", she helps keep Eugene safe when the bus crashes, and promises to keep his secret about sabotaging the bus. She is not happy when Eugene reveals he lied about knowing a cure, but still defends him when an enraged Abraham nearly beats him to death.

In the episode "Remember", when the survivors arrive in Alexandria, Tara is assigned the job of a supply runner. In the episode "Spend, Tara is tasked with looting the warehouse for parts needed to restore power to Alexandria, along with Nicholas, Aiden, Glenn, Noah, and Eugene. Inside the warehouse, Aiden accidentally shoots a grenade on a walker, leaving Tara knocked unconscious by the blast. Eugene looks after Tara and, when the walkers begin to close in, he summons up the courage to carry her out to safety inside the van and Tara is taken back to Alexandria. In the season finale "Conquer", after days of being unconscious, Tara wakes up in Alexandria with Rosita by her side.

Season 6

In the season premiere "First Time Again", Tara is still recovering in bed while Maggie and Rosita check up on her. She is soon able to walk around and helps with building a wall barrier, to help guard the walkers that are stuck in the quarry. She and Maggie discuss how Nicholas caused Noah's death and Maggie reveals to her that Nicholas tried to kill Glenn. Maggie then reminds her she, too, was on the enemy's side when the Governor attacked, and the two embrace. In the episode "JSS", Tara is first seen in the infirmary with Eugene. Tara meets Denise and asks why she has not met her yet. Tara asks Denise if she can help her with a headache. As the wolves attack Alexandria, Tara, Eugene and Denise stay in the infirmary. An injured Holly is brought in who has been stabbed. Tara notices Denise being reluctant to help a dying Holly and pressures her to help. Despite Denise trying her best to save Holly, she dies due to blood loss. Before Tara leaves the infirmary, she quietly reminds Denise to destroy Holly's brain so she will not reanimate. In the episode "Now", Tara encourages Denise not to give up hope on Scott. Denise tells her later that he will make it and kisses her. In the episode "Heads Up", Tara saves an Alexandrian, Spencer (Austin Nichols) by shooting at walkers after Spencer falls into a herd for trying to use a zip-line to crawl across. Despite saving his life, Rick is angry at her for wasting bullets and she flips him off. Rick apologizes but says that she didn't need to save him. In the mid-season finale "Start to Finish", Tara is first seen helping drag Tobin to safety when the walls fall down and the herd enters Alexandria. She and Rosita then rescue Eugene and take refuge in a nearby garage, trapped in there by the walkers. Rosita is beginning to give up hope but Tara encourages her to keep going and the trio start working to escape the garage. Later on, they escape and stumble into the same room The Wolf is holding Denise captive, with Carol and Morgan unconscious on the floor. He forces them to surrender their weapons and Tara watches helplessly as he takes Denise with him as a hostage. In the mid-season premiere "No Way Out", Tara joins Rick and the rest of the town in wiping out the walkers. In the episode "The Next World", two months later, Tara and Denise (who managed to survive the event) are now living together as a couple. In the episode "Not Tomorrow Yet", Tara accompanies the group to the Saviors' compound to infiltrate and kill them. Both Gabriel and Paul "Jesus" Monroe comfort Tara, who is feeling guilty for lying to Denise. She later kills one member of the Saviors. Heath and Tara then leave to go on a two-week supply run.

Season 7

Tara returns in the episode "Swear". She gets separated from Heath, ending up on a beach, unconscious. A girl named Cyndie gives her water and leaves. Soon after, Tara wakes up and follows her, only to find a community called Oceanside full of armed women who kill any stranger on sight. She is discovered and tries to flee as the women try to gun her down. She is later captured. At dinner, she learns they were massacred by a group called the Saviors. Tara is asked to stay by the leader of the community, Natania, but she convinces them to let her go, as she says she needs to get back to her girlfriend (unaware that Denise was murdered by Dwight). Later, Tara realizes she is being led out to be killed, so she escapes with the help of Cyndie, who asks her to swear not to tell anybody else about the community. Tara returns home only to find out about the deaths. Rosita asks if there is a place, no matter how dangerous, to find guns, to fight against Negan and the Saviors. Tara lies, saying she did not see anything on her supply run, thus keeping her promise to Cyndie. In the mid-season finale, "Hearts Still Beating", Tara arrives outside Rick's house to give Olivia (Ann Mahoney) Denise's lemonade at Negan's request. Tara comforts Olivia for having to face Negan. Later, Tara, Rosita, Carl, and other Alexandrians watch the exchange between Negan and Spencer Monroe over a game of pool as Spencer tries to convince Negan to kill Rick and put him in charge. Tara watches in horror with everyone else as Negan brutally murders Spencer. Soon after, Rosita pulls out her gun and tries to shoot Negan, only to miss and hit Lucille, his beloved baseball bat. Enraged, Negan threatens Rosita, which Tara is visually distressed about. Arat, one of Negan's soldiers, shoots Olivia in the face after Rosita lies about who made the bullet she shot Lucille with, resulting in Negan ordering Arat to kill someone of her choice. Tara lies and says she made the bullet before Eugene admits he did it and is taken away.

In the episode "New Best Friends", Tara is part of the group that meets the Scavengers while Rick negotiates a deal with them to fight the Saviors. In the episode "Say Yes", Tara is shown to be conflicted because she knows that Oceanside has the numbers and weapons to make a difference in the fight but does not want to break her promise to Cyndie. She also knows that if Rick and the others go to Oceanside, it will most likely lead to a fight. She ultimately comes to Rick at the end of the episode and states that there is something she needs to tell him. In the episode "Something They Need", Tara tells Rick and the others about Oceanside and their considerable firepower, so they form a plan to ambush the community and take the weapons. Tara infiltrates the community and attempts to convince Natania and Cyndie to join their fight. When they refuse, Tara is forced to go along with Rick's plan to take the community hostage. Natania manages to disarm Tara and holds her at gunpoint, demanding they all leave. Rick refuses and states they are taking the guns one way or another. The tensions are halted when a herd of walkers converges on them, forcing the groups to work together. When Oceanside still refuses to aid them, the group leaves with their weapons (although Tara promises to return them once the fighting is done). After thanking Cyndie once more for her help, Rick approaches Tara and reminds her that she does not have to feel guilty. Tara responds that she knows that and does not anymore. Tara returns to Alexandria with Rick and the others, to find Rosita waiting for them. She explains that Dwight is in their cell.

In the season finale, "The First Day of the Rest of Your Life", Tara encourages Daryl to kill Dwight as revenge for Denise's death, but Daryl resists. Later, Tara is shown to be disappointed in Rick and Daryl's decision to trust Dwight. At the battle with Negan the following day, when Rosita is shot, Tara helps her to safety. Tara is later seen at Rosita's bedside while she heals from her injuries.

Season 8

In the season premiere episode, "Mercy", Tara is seen with Daryl, Morgan and Carol organizing a plan to attack the sanctuary and then with Jesus and Dianne they start attacking several outposts of the saviors.

In the episode "The King, the Widow, and Rick", Tara expresses to Daryl her desire to kill Dwight, as revenge for him killing her girlfriend. In the mid-season finale "How It's Gotta Be", Tara and others find Dwight on a road, after a lone Savior gets away amid gunfire. Tara decides to spare him, however, and allows him to go back to Alexandria with her group.

Season 9

In "A New Beginning", Tara is scouting one of the roads when Eugene radios her, informing her that a group will head to Washington D.C. to search for farming materials for the Sanctuary. On the road, Tara and the others learn from Daryl and Rosita that the main bridge is out due to a storm. Rick tells Tara, Gabriel, Aaron and Anne to head back to Alexandria and the rest will go to an alternate route and spend the night at the Sanctuary.

In "The Bridge", when the communities came together to repair the bridge that had fallen, Tara settled in the camp that the workers built in the forest and was in charge of monitoring the surroundings to prevent the dead from approaching the area. She got on a crane to have a better view and from there coordinated with the other watchers the strategies to distract the creatures. When one of the alarms fails to go off, it quickly alerts Rick to the horde heading towards them and prevents a surprise attack.

Sometime within the six-year time jump after the events that lead to Rick's apparent death and Maggie's leaving with Georgie, Tara moves to the Hilltop. After a falling out with Michonne, Tara takes the charter Michonne had written up and heads off to the Hilltop. Once there, Tara becomes Jesus' second-in-command. After his death at the hands of rival group the Whisperers, Tara becomes the leader, with Enid and Alden acting as her right hands. Tara interrogates Lydia alongside Daryl and Michonne when they bring her to Hilltop.

In the episode "The Calm Before", while at the Kingdom's fair, Tara, alongside Gabriel, Ezekiel, Carol, and Rachel, signs the charter to create the Coalition. Soon afterward, however, Tara is kidnapped by the Whisperers. She, alongside Enid, Henry, Siddiq, Tammy, Frankie, Addy, and Rodney are taken to a barn guarded by the Whisperers. After Ozzy, Alec, and D.J. find them, the group is able to fight and kill several Whisperers before being overtaken and decapitated in front of Siddiq. Tara's severed, undead head is found by Daryl, Carol, Michonne, Yumiko, and Siddiq on a pike marking the new border. Back at the fair, Siddiq recounts Tara's last moments as heroic.

Development and reception

Masterson was promoted to the main cast for the renewed fifth season. As of the second episode of the seventh season, her name appears in the opening credits.

For the episode "Crossed" in the fifth season, Zack Handlen, writing for The A.V. Club commented positively on the character, saying, "Tara is pretty great."

For the episode "Swear", the character of Tara was mostly well received. Matt Fowler commented that, "Tara still needs a bit of work from a character standpoint, but at least her conviction that all the murders her crew committed were justified more or less fits with her as someone who was part of the Governor's assault on Rick's prison". He was also skeptical about her decision to lie about the community. Zack Handlen, writing for The AV Club was more complimentary on the ending scene, calling it "a rare example of a character actually making a difficult but responsible moral choice!". He praised Tara in the hour, saying, "As maybe the closest thing to self-aware comic relief the show has left, Tara remains likable enough" and praised the "moment of selflessness and faith" in not speaking of Oceanside which "generates one of the few moments of legitimate tension in the whole hour." Despite this, he was critical of her decision to lie to members of Oceanside saying, "I like Tara, but it's harder to root for her when she tells such hilariously stupid lies. Her decision to talk about Rick and company murdering a bunch of Negan's men also seems like a bad call. (“You should totally trust my group! We're good at killing!”)"

Masterson's performance received a mixed response from critics. Jacob Stolworthy for The Independent was complimentary of Masterson's portrayal of Tara saying, "Granted, if fans were told they'd be getting an episode dedicated to Tara upon her introduction in season four, eyebrows would have been raised. But it's through this character – played with a refreshing charm by Masterson (whose pregnancy is to account for her lack of presence) – that we meet yet another new community". Conversely, Shane Ryan for Paste Magazine was extremely critical of Masterson's performance. He went further to say, "I went from thinking this was an episode about a couple of badass tropical killers to realizing the mysterious body washed up on shore belonged to Tara…that was the worst kind of gut punch." In contrast to Stolworthy, Ryan disliked the humor in the episode saying, "Every single “funny” bit of dialogue Tara uttered under stress was painfully unfunny. Hire a comedy writer, Walking Dead. Your shit needs a punch-up."

Ron Hogan for Den of Geek was complimentary of Tara's humor, saying, "Alanna Masterson has some good comedic sensibilities [...] However, I just don't feel like Tara's a strong enough character to carry an entire episode, and neither she nor Heath have been developed enough to disappear for two months' worth of episodes stretched across two seasons." Conversely, Jeff Stone for IndieWire liked the decision to focus on Tara for an episode saying, "Tara has always been a sentimental favorite of mine, with her humorous streak and unwillingness to be a full-blown Ricketeer stormtrooper. It's nice to have her back."

Some critics felt the characterization of the core group of survivors, including Tara, was off in "Something They Need". Ron Hagan for Den of Geek! said, "Rick and Tara finally discuss the presence of the Seaside Motel group, and that means he's ready to go wage a full-fledged assault on a group of women and children, blowing up dynamite outside their walls, drawing the attention of zombies in the area, and then taking all their guns away to fight his own battle. And yes, that's the hero of the story." He was relieved that the cliffhanger involving Sasha in the previous week was not stretched out to the finale. Zack Handlen for The A.V. Club had a similar perspective on raiding Oceanside. He said, "The fact that Tara not only signed off on this plan, but also seems to be one hundred percent behind it, is at odds with everything we know about her. However much she's supposed to believe in Rick now (and clearly, she's supposed to believe in him a lot), for her to willingly go in on such an openly aggressive scheme is bizarre. This isn't “we're going to talk, and see what happens next.”

Her last appearance as a regular character on the show was in the season 9 episode "The Calm Before".

Noel Murray of Rolling Stone ranked Tara Chambler 15th in a list of 30 best Walking Dead characters, saying, "from the start, Alanna Masterson always emphasized the character's sense of humor and her compassion for others, as evidenced by her passionate romantic relationships with women like Alisha and Denise. She's become one of the easiest heroes to root for; her self-deprecation and sensitivity make her highly relatable."

References

American female characters in television
Fictional LGBT characters in television
Fictional lesbians
Fictional murdered people
Fictional sole survivors
Fictional women soldiers and warriors
Fictional zombies and revenants
Television characters introduced in 2011
The Walking Dead (franchise) characters